Michael or Mike Brooks may refer to:

Arts and entertainment 

 Michael Brooks (historian and journalist) (born 1964), American historian and investigative journalist
 Michael Brooks (music historian) (1935–2020), American music historian and record producer
 Michael Brooks (political commentator) (1983–2020), American writer, host of The Michael Brooks Show and The Majority Report with Sam Seder
 Michael Brooks (science writer) (born 1970), English science writer and commentator
 Mike Brooks (singer) (born 1953), Jamaican reggae singer active since the early 1970s
 Mike Brooks (journalist) (1955–2021), American television news correspondent

Sports 

 Michael Brooks (basketball) (1958–2016), American basketball player
 Michael Brooks (linebacker) (born 1964), American football linebacker
 Michael Brooks (defensive back) (born 1967), American football safety
 Mic'hael Brooks (born 1991), American football defensive tackle

Others 

 Michael Brooks-Jimenez (born 1969/70), American politician

See also 

 Michael Brook (born 1951), Canadian guitarist
 Michael A. Brookes (born c. 1965), U.S. Navy officer 
 Mike Cannon-Brookes (born 1979), Australian entrepreneur